Phobrang is a settlement in the Indian union territory of Ladakh. It is near Lukung on the way the Indo-China border at the Hot Springs.

Phobrang is in the Leh district, Durbuk tehsil. It is the headquarters of a Halqa Panchahat (village administration), which covers the entire Pangong Tso region of Ladakh till Man Pangong.
Phobrang was apparently lightly populated in the 19th century, but, at present, there is a small residential area, along with numerous semi-nomadic camping grounds, grazing grounds and farmlands, situated in an alluvial plain watered by a river flowing from the north. There is a Green Himalayas project under way to convert Phobrang to an eco-tourism site.

The 84 km-long Marsimik La Road from Lukung to Hot Springs passes through Phobrang.
There is also a 40 km-long road from Phobrang to Chartse on the north bank of Pangong Tso.
Both these roads are meant for mainly military use.

References 

Villages in Durbuk tehsil